In Mandaeism, Shahrat is a ship or boat mentioned in the Scroll of Abatur. Shahrat ferries souls from Tibil across the river Hitpun and into the house of Abatur. According to the Mandaean priest Brikha Nasoraia (2021), it is basically a "space-ship" traveling "faster than the speed of light" through ayar (ether) to higher realms.

In Mandaean Book of John 55:60–61, the ship ferrying souls to the house of Abatur is described as follows.
I (Hibil Ziwa) made a ship for the good,
a ferry of souls carrying them,
over to Abatur's house,
who gives them strength and truth from head to toe.

See also
Hitpun
Solar barque in ancient Egyptian mythology
Charon, the ferryman of the underworld in Greek mythology
Nibiru (Babylonian astronomy), "crossing" (especially of rivers)

References

Mandaean cosmology
Mythological ships